Sir Robert Reginald Frederick Butler, 1st Baronet (19 June 1866 – 19 November 1933) was an English businessman.

Butler was born in Edford, Somerset, and educated at Bedford School. He was director of a number of catering and confectionery companies, notably chairman of United Dairies. He was created a Baronet in the 1922 New Year Honours for his wartime services.

Footnotes

References
Obituary, The Times, 20 November 1933
Sir Reginald Butler, Notes of the Day, Western Daily Press, 23 November 1933

1866 births
1933 deaths
People educated at Bedford School
English businesspeople
Baronets in the Baronetage of the United Kingdom